"Sweet Talk" is a song recorded by Australian singer Samantha Jade. "Sweet Talk" was written by Charli Taft, Brian Lee and Andrew Bolooki, and produced by Paro, with co-production from Brian Lee. It was first released on 18 November 2014, and subsequently debuted at number thirty-eight on the Australian ARIA singles chart. The song's accompanying music video was released on 21 November 2014 via YouTube, alongside its physical CD single release.

Background and promotion

A month after her mother's death, Jade, accompanied by her father and brothers embarked on an international trip ending in London, where Jade recorded "Sweet Talk".

Following the release of the single, Jade embarked on a regional tour to promote "Sweet Talk", consisting of a three-date Victoria tour, Albury's QEII Square on Friday and Victoria Park Lake in Shepparton.

Critical reception

Marcel Jeremiah of FDRMX gave a positive review on the song, citing the production to be similar like Dr. Luke hits, also saying "Even though “Sweet Talk” sounds like a summer anthem, maybe it can add a little sunshine to the freezing December weather".

Track listing

Charts

Cover versions
 The song was sampled by DJ artist Discandy on the track called "Tasty Carrots" which is featured on the video-sharing social networking service TikTok.

Release history

References

2014 singles
2014 songs
Samantha Jade songs
Sony Music Australia singles
Songs written by Brian Lee (songwriter)
Songs written by Charli Taft